Udon ( or ) is a thick noodle made from wheat flour, used in Japanese cuisine. There are a variety of ways it is prepared and served. It is usually topped with thinly chopped scallions. Other common toppings include prawn tempura,  (mixed tempura fritter),  (sweet, deep-fried tofu pouches),  (sliced fish cake), and  spice added to taste.

Standard broth differs by region. Dark  soy sauce is added in eastern Japan, while light  soy sauce is added in the west. Instant noodles are often sold in two (or more) versions accordingly.

More unusual variants include stir-fried  and curry udon made with Japanese curry.

Origin

There are many stories explaining the origin of udon.

One story says that in AD 1241, Enni, a Rinzai monk, introduced flour milling technology from Song China to Japan. Floured crops were then made into noodles such as udon, soba, and pancakes in Japan which were eaten by locals. Milling techniques were spread around the country.

Another story states that during the Nara period, a Japanese envoy to Tang Dynasty China was introduced to 14 different kinds of food. The  is believed to be an origin for many kinds of Japanese noodles.

Yet another story says that a Buddhist priest called Kūkai introduced udon noodles to Shikoku during the Heian Era. Kūkai, the Buddhist priest, traveled to Tang Dynasty China around the beginning of the 9th century to study. Sanuki Province claimed to have been the first to adopt udon noodles from Kūkai. Hakata province claimed to have produced udon noodles based on Enni's recipe.

Dishes
Udon noodles are boiled in a pot of hot water. Depending on the type of udon, the way it is served is different as well. Udon noodles are usually served chilled in the summer and hot in the winter. In the Edo period, the thicker wheat noodle was generally called udon, and served with a hot broth called . The chilled variety was called .

Cold udon, or udon salad, is usually mixed with egg omelette slices, shredded chicken and fresh vegetables, such as cucumber and radish. Toppings of udon soup are chosen to reflect the seasons. Most toppings are added without much cooking, although deep-fried tempura is sometimes added. Many of these dishes may also be prepared with soba.

Hot

 : ("power udon"): topped with toasted mochi rice cakes.
 : with deep-fried shredded burdock root
 : ("modern udon"): see . From 
 : served in a communal hot-pot with hot water, and accompanied by a hot dipping sauce of dashi sukiyaki.
The term  is a reference to the Nanban trade which had influenced Japanese culture for a century before being banned in 1639 by the Edo Shogunate. Biei, Hokkaido is famous for a unique curry udon.
 : topped with maruten, deep-fried large fish cake
The most common ingredients are tempura shrimp with mushrooms and an egg cracked on top.
 : dashi broth with kombu flakes.
 : chicken and egg, with sliced onion in a sweetened dashi soup over udon. It has a sweet savory flavor.
 : see 
 : ("stamina udon"): udon with various hearty ingredients, usually including meat, a raw egg, and vegetables.
 : ("moon-viewing udon"): topped with raw egg, which poaches in the hot soup.
 : topped with wakame, a dark green seaweed.
Originated in Kitakyushu, Fukuoka Prefecture. Note that while  is made with udon,  is made with steamed Chinese-style ramen, not buckwheat soba.

Cold

 : cold udon served with thick dashi broth.
 : cold udon served on its own.
Accompanied by a chilled dipping sauce, usually a strong mixture of dashi, mirin, and soy sauce. Eaten with wasabi or grated ginger.

Regional varieties

Japan 
There are wide variations in both thickness and shape for udon noodles.
 : similar to the Hohtoh, from Ōita Prefecture. Nominally a "dumpling soup", it resembles very thick, flat udon.
 : a slightly translucent, chewy type from Kutchan, Hokkaido. Literally "heavy snow udon", made from the starch of potatoes. The texture is different from normal udon which is made from flour. At the foot of Mount Yōtei, Hokkaido, the biggest producing area of potatoes, "potato starch udon" was eaten as a home food for farmers from long ago. The ratio of potato starch and wheat flour was improved to make it delicious even after a long time. The origin of the name "heavy snow udon" is the foot of Mount Yōtei, a heavy snowfall area, and the appearance of the noodles which is slightly translucent like snow.
 : a thick and soft type from the Fukuoka.
 : an extreme flat and wide type from Kiryū, Gunma.
 Hōtō (rarely , commonly ): a type of miso soup with a flat and wide type udon and vegetables, particularly kabocha. One of the significant differences between usual udon and Hōtō udon is salt. When Hōtō udon is made, salt is not added to the noodle dough. from Yamanashi Prefecture.
 : a thin type from Akita Prefecture.
 : a soft type, usually eaten with sweet soy sauce, from Ise, Mie.
 In Kansai region, a soft and medium thickness type is popular.

 Kishimen (or more commonly ): a flat type with wavy edges, a regional specialty from Nagoya.
 : a lucky preserved food in Kuzu, Tochigi. It looks similar to ears.
 Miso-nikomi udon: a local dish of Nagoya, a hard udon simmered in red miso soup. The soup generally contains chicken, a floating cracked raw egg that is stirred in by the eater, kamaboko, vegetables and tubers. The noodles are extremely firm in order to stand up to the prolonged simmering in the soup; additionally, the noodles do not contain salt, so as to avoid over-salting from the salt in the miso.
 Saitama Prefecture has several varieties of udon.
 : produced in Kazo, Saitama, a place of active wheat production. Its very orthodox hand-kneading process characterizes Kazo udon noodles. 
 : a type of hotoh from Fukaya, Saitama. Boiled noodles using plenty of Fukaya green onions characterize Fuyaya Niboto udon. 
 : originated of Kōnosu, Saitama in 2009. it is characterized by its width that is as wide as eight centimeters. 
 : originated of Niiza, Saitama in 2002. The noodles are kneaded with carrot and are characterized by their vivid orange color.
 : a thick and rather stiff type from Kagawa Prefecture.
 : a specialty of Nagasaki Prefecture. Literally "plate udon," consisting of thinner udon that are deep fried and served with any of a number of toppings.

Korea 

In Korea, authentic Japanese udon dishes are served in numerous Japanese restaurants, while the Korean-style udon noodle soups are served in bunsikjip (snack bars) and pojangmacha (street stalls). Both types are called udong, which is the transliteration of the Japanese word udon. In Korea, the word udong refers to noodle dishes (typically noodle soup), while the noodles themselves are called udong-myeon ("udong noodles") and considered a type of garak-guksu ("thick noodles"). Common ingredients for udong noodle soup include crowndaisy greens and eomuk (fish cakes), neither of which are very common in Japanese udon dishes.

Palau 
There is a dish called udong in Palau, originated from the former Japanese administration. The broth is soy sauce–based like Japanese udon. However, as there were many immigrants from Okinawa, it uses less broth like Okinawa soba. Most notably, the noodle is that of spaghetti, as it is easier to acquire there.

Philippines 

Odong are wheat based yellow thick Chinese noodles (pancit), similar to Okinawa soba. A typical odong bowl is prepared with canned sardine and tomato sauce. Other dishes such as layering with greens are also popular. During the early 1900s, there was a large community of Japanese laborers in Davao, half of them Okinawans. In this period, the Japanese manufactured odong.

Tourism

Kagawa prefecture is well known throughout Japan for its sanuki udon (讃岐うどん). It is promoted to other regions of Japan through themed mascots, souvenirs and movies.

Gallery

See also

Thick wheat noodles:
Bigoli, similar Italian noodle from Veneto
Cumian, similar Chinese noodle
Kal-guksu, similar Korean noodle
Pici, similar Italian noodle from Tuscany
Japanese noodles:
Hiyamugi
Soba
Sōmen
Okinawa soba

References

 Tsuji, Shizuo (1980). Japanese Cooking: A Simple Art. Kodansha International/USA, New York. 

 
Japanese cuisine
Japanese noodles
Noodle soups